Founded by Rabbi Arthur Schneier in 1965, the Appeal of Conscience Foundation is an interfaith partnership of corporate and spiritual leaders from all faiths who come together to promote "peace, tolerance and ethnic conflict resolution."

Mission
The Appeal's philosophy is that freedom, democracy and human rights are basic principles, and if they are granted, nations of the world have their best hope for “peace, security and shared prosperity.”

"A crime committed in the name of religion is the greatest crime against religion,” is the organization's mantra. Following the act of  September 11th, the ACF has rallied religious leaders worldwide to take a stand against terrorism and to use their influence to halt violence and promote tolerance.

The true motivation of the Appeal has been called into question following the honoring of Indonesian president Yudhoyono despite controversy within Indonesia and the ongoing genocide Yudhoyono's government is overseeing in West Papua.

Activities
Delegations from the group meet and have met with religious and government leaders throughout the world promoting peace and democracy. Some of its work has been in conducted in Albania, Argentina, Armenia, Bulgaria, People's Republic of China, the Commonwealth of Independent States (CIS), Cuba, Czech Republic, El Salvador, Germany, the Vatican City, Hungary, India, Indonesia, Ireland, Japan, Morocco, Panama, Poland, Romania, Russia, Slovak Republic, Switzerland, Spain, Turkey, Ukraine, United Kingdom and the former Yugoslavia.

The Foundation frequently hosts diplomatic and clerical groups from abroad to acquaint them with the religious life in America society.

World Statesman of the Year
The 2022 recipient was Italy's Prime Minister, Mario Draghi.

The 2021 recipient was Former Prime Minister of Japan, Shinzo Abe.

The 2019 recipient was Prime Minister of Singapore, Lee Hsien Loong.

The 2016 recipient was French President, François Hollande.

The 2015 recipient was British Prime Minister, David Cameron.

The 2014 recipient was Mexican President, Enrique Peña Nieto.

The 2013 recipient was Indonesian President Susilo Bambang Yudhoyono.

The 2012 recipient was Canada's Prime Minister, Stephen Harper.

Complete List:

Sep 20, 2011
Address by President Lee Myung-bak
President Lee Myung-bak of The Republic of Korea, recipient of the 2009 World Statesman Award.

May 12, 2011
Address by Francois Delattre of France
On behalf of President Nicolas Sarkozy of France, Ambassador Francois Delattre presented Rabbi Arthur Schneier with the Legion of Honor in recognition of his tireless efforts to promote and support religious freedom, human rights and interfaith tolerance all over the world

Sep 23, 2010
Address by Bill Burns, US Under Secretary of State for Political Affairs
in absence of Prime Minister Manmohan Singh of India, recipient of the 2010 World Statesman Award.

Sep 22, 2009
Address by Ivan Lewis on behalf of PM Gordon Brown
The Gordon Brown, Prime Minister of the United Kingdom received the 2009 World Statesman Award

Sep 22, 2009
Address by Muhtar Kent
Muhtar Kent, Chairman & CEO, The Coca-Cola Company received the 2009 Appeal of Conscience Award

Sep 22, 2009
Address by Bernard J. Arnault
Bernard J. Arnault, Chairman & CEO, LVMH Moët Hennessy Louis Vuitton received  the 2009 Appeal of Conscience Award

Sep 23, 2008
Address by Jeffrey R. Immelt, President & CEO, GE
Jeffrey Immelt received  the 2008 Appeal of Conscience Award

Sep 23, 2008
Address by Mayor Michael R. Bloomberg
Mayor Bloomberg delivers speech accepting the 2008 Appeal of Conscience Foundation Public Service Award

Sep 23, 2008
Remarks by Deputy Secretary John D. Negroponte
Deputy Secretary highlights honorees at the 2008 ACF Annual Awards Dinner

Sep 23, 2008
Address by Nicolas Sarkozy
President of the French Republic is recipient of the 2008 Appeal of Conscience World Statesman Award

Sep 23, 2008
Address by Henry A. Kissinger
Henry Kissinger gives address on behalf of Nicolas Sarkozy, President of the French Republic, at the ACF 2008 Annual Awards Dinner

Sep 21, 2005
Foreign Minister Alexander Downer
Acceptance of the World Statesman Award on behalf of the Prime Minister of Australia, John Howard, at the 40th anniversary dinner of the Appeal of Conscience Foundation

Sep 21, 2005
Jorma Ollila, Chairman and CEO, Nokia
Acceptance of the Appeal of Conscience Award Jorma Ollila, Chairman and CEO, Nokia Appeal of Conscience Foundation 40th Annual Awards Dinner New York September 21, 2005

Sep 21, 2005
Peter G. Peterson, Chairman, Blackstone Group
Honorable Peter G. Peterson, Chairman, Council on Foreign Relations, at the Appeal of Conscience Foundation 40th Anniversary Dinner September 21, 2005

Sep 20, 2004
Sir John Bond, HSBC Chairman, 2004 Dinner
Sir John Bond, HSBC Chairman, APPEAL OF CONSCIENCE FOUNDATION DINNER

Oct 14, 2003
Address by José Mará Aznar
President of the Government of Spain, recipient of the 2003 Appeal of Conscience World Statesman Award

Oct 14, 2003
Address by Dr. Josef Ackermann
Chairman Group Executive Committee and Spokesman of the Board of Managing Directors, Deutsche Bank Recipient of the 2003 Appeal of Conscience Award

Oct 01, 2002
Address by Rabbi Arthur Schneier
Appeal of Conscience Annual Awards Dinner Honoring Jean Chrétien and Carleton S. Fiorina

Oct 01, 2002
Address by Carly Fiorina
Chairman and CEO of Hewlett-Packard Company - receipt of the Appeal of Conscience Award Appeal of Conscience Foundation Annual Awards Dinner

Oct 01, 2002
Address by Prime Minister Jean Chrétien
2002 Appeal of Conscience Annual Award Dinner

Controversy
The 2013 'World Statesman of the Year' was highly controversial since Indonesian President Susilo Bambang Yudhoyono has failed to protect religious minorities in the world's largest Muslim-majority country, and overseen what has been determined to be a genocide in West Papua  Instead of promoting tolerance, President Yudhoyono has overseen a sharp increase in acts of intolerance to Ahmadiyah Muslims, Shi'ite Muslims, and Christians, leading to widespread public criticism from human rights activists, academics, and persecuted minority groups.

Petitions to Rabbi Schneier to withdraw the award garnered over 10,000 signatures from around the globe. Instead of heeding the concerns of persecuted minorities, Rabbi Schneier granted the award and helped President Yudhoyono to, "whitewash his legacy." Human rights activists eventually concluded that the Appeal of Conscience Foundation was little more than a vehicle for publicity-seeking and influence-peddling.

Listing of The Appeal of Conscience Actions
 April 29, 2019 - Cooperation Agreement signed between the Appeal of Conscience Foundation and the Muslim World League to unite efforts to protect religious sites around the world.
November 9, 2005 - Declaration of the Peace and Tolerance II Conference: Dialogue and Understanding in Southeast Europe, the Caucasus and Central Asia
 July 28, 2005 - Call for Action on Darfur
 December 1, 2000 - A Call to Stop Desecration of Holy Sites by a delegation to the United Nations
 March 18, 1999 - Kosovo Peace and Tolerance Vienna Declaration (With former U.S. Congress member Joe DioGuardi of the Albanian American Civic League)
 May 21, 1998 - Joint Declaration of the Delegation of Religious Leaders from Bosnia and Herzegovina and the Appeal of Conscience Foundation 
 March 30, 1995 - The Vienna Declaration Signed at the Appeal of Conscience Conflict Resolution Conference
 February 9, 1994 - Bosphorus Declaration was signed at the Appeal of Conscience Conference on Peace and Tolerance
 November 26, 1992 – The Bern Declaration for Peace in Bosnia and Herzegovina

References

External links
 John D. Negroponte, Deputy Secretary of State’s Remarks to Appeal of Conscience Foundation, March 27, 2007
 Appeal of Conscience Website

Religious organizations based in the United States
Interfaith organizations
Organizations based in New York City
1965 establishments in the United States